Molęda or Moleda is a Polish-language surname, a variant of Molenda. The word molenda used to mean miller, from  Latin molendinator.

Notable people with this surname include:

Cezary Moleda, (born 1960), Polish football manager
Jakub Molęda (born 1984), Polish singer, composer and theatre actor
, Polish sociologist
 (born 1976), Polish singer, composer and songwriter
Mateusz Molęda (born 1986), German-Polish conductor

References

Polish-language surnames
Occupational surnames